The 2003 UIAA Climbing World Championships, the 7th edition, were held in Chamonix, France from 9 to 13 July 2003. It was organized by the Union Internationale des Associations d'Alpinisme (UIAA). The championships consisted of lead, speed, and bouldering events.

Medalists

Lead

Men 
Tomáš Mrázek clinched gold medal after climbing 2 meters higher than the rest of the field. Patxi Usobiaga Lakunza won silver medal by edging out David Caude who took bronze. Alexandre Chabot placed 5th.

Women 
Muriel Sarkany took the win by climbing 2 meter higher than her closest competition. Six climbers struggled on the same hold: touching, holding, or moving off it. In the end, Emilie Pouget claimed silver medal, ahead of her teammate Sandrine Levet who claimed bronze.

Bouldering 
Bouldering scores were decided by number of tops, number of attempts to tops, number of zones, and number of attempts to zones in decreasing order of importance.

Men 
Christian Core sent four boulder problems in the final round and won gold medal after edging out Jérôme Meyer by one less attempt. Tomasz Oleksy placed 3rd.

Women 
Sandrine Levet topped 5 boulder problems in the final round, securing a gold medal. Nataliya Perlova sent 3 problems and placed second, while Fanny Rogeaux sent 2 problems in two attempts claiming third place.

Speed

Men 
Maksym Styenkovvy took the win. Tomasz Oleksy placed second and Alexander Peshekhonov placed third.

Women 
Olena Ryepko took the win. Tatiana Ruyga placed second and Yurina Valentina third.

References 

World Climbing Championships
IFSC Climbing World Championships
International sports competitions hosted by France